Portuguese Africans are Portuguese people born or permanently settled in Africa (they should not be confused with Portuguese of Black African ancestry). The largest Portuguese African population lives in Portugal numbering over 1 million with large and important minorities living in South Africa, Namibia and the Portuguese-speaking African countries (Angola, Cape Verde, Guinea-Bissau, Mozambique, São Tomé and Príncipe and Equatorial Guinea).The descendants of the Portuguese settlers who were born and "raised" locally since Portuguese colonial time were called crioulos. Much of the original population is unnumbered having been assimilated into Portugal, Brazil, and other countries. 

Guinea-Bissau became an independent country in 1974, followed by the rest of the colonies in 1975. Most Portuguese residents, for this reason, returned to Portugal, where they were called retornados. Some from Angola or Mozambique went to South Africa, Malawi, Namibia, Zimbabwe, Botswana or the United States and Brazil or Europe.

When the Community of Portuguese-Speaking Countries was founded in 1996, some Portuguese and a number of Brazilians of Portuguese racial background arrived for economic and educational aid to the Portuguese-speaking African countries. Some of these Portuguese adopted them as their permanent home.

Most Portuguese Africans are Portuguese-South Africans, and Portuguese Angolans, mainly as a result of direct migration from Portugal, namely from Madeira.

As shown below, there are 64,000 estimated Portuguese Africans in African countries (except for South Africa) not being PALOP members.

Populations by country

See also
 Portuguese Americans
 Portuguese Angolans
 Portuguese Guineans
 Portuguese Mozambicans
 Portuguese-South Africans

References

 
+

 
+